William David Robinson (15 March 1931 - 12 June 2003) was Archdeacon of Blackburn from 1986 to 1996.

He was educated at Queen Elizabeth's Grammar School, Blackburn and Durham University and ordained in 1958. Standish and Lancaster Priory. He was Vicar of  St James, Blackburn from 1963 to 1973; and priest in charge of St James, Shireshead from 1973 to his appointment as an Archdeacon.

References

1931 births
2003 deaths
People educated at Queen Elizabeth's Grammar School, Blackburn
Archdeacons of Blackburn
Alumni of St John's College, Durham